Escort West is a 1959 American Western film directed by Francis D. Lyon, and starring Victor Mature, Faith Domergue, and Elaine Stewart. The movie is set after the U.S. Civil War, when a former Confederate officer, played by Victor Mature, and his daughter help some survivors of an Indian massacre. The film was released by United Artists on January 23, 1959.

It was the second of two co-productions between Batjac and Romina Productions. Their first was China Doll (1957).

The movie was filmed largely on the Iverson Movie Ranch in Chatsworth, California, with additional footage shot on the nearby Bell Moving Picture Ranch. The site of the Bell Ranch location shoot remained a mystery for decades until it was discovered on an expedition by film location researchers in early 2015. The researchers found the location by using information from "Escort West" and the first Elvis Presley movie, Love Me Tender, which filmed its climactic sequence at the same site, known as the "Rocky Hill."

Plot
Now that the Civil War is over, former Confederate officer Ben Lassiter and his 10-year-old daughter ride west to Nevada, where they stop off briefly at a stagecoach rest station. There they encounter sisters Beth and Martha Drury, who greet them in different ways. Beth is cordial to Ben, whereas Martha makes no secret of her dislike for rebel soldiers.

Beth is engaged to an army captain, Poole, and plans to travel to Oregon with her sister, whose husband was a Union officer killed in the war. Indians attack the rest station after Ben and his daughter ride off. When he sees warriors with liquor from the way station, Ben doubles back. He finds the Drury sisters safe, hidden in a cellar, plus an Army payroll that the Indians neglected to take.

Ben escorts the women west and intends to deliver the payroll to Poole, who is fighting off Indian attacks himself. Ben's bravery repeatedly impresses Beth, but with each passing hour Martha becomes more unstable. She panics, flees and the Indians kill her. Ben copes with a pair of Army deserters and a renegade scout named Tago along the way, ultimately leading Beth and his daughter to safety.

Cast
Victor Mature as Ben Lassiter  
Reba Waters as Abbey Lassiter
Elaine Stewart as Beth Drury 
Faith Domergue as Martha Drury 
Noah Beery Jr. as Lt. Jamison 
William Ching as Capt. Howard Poole   
Harry Carey Jr. as  Trooper Travis
Slim Pickens as  Corporal Wheeler  
Rex Ingram as Nelson Walker 
Leo Gordon as Trooper Vogel
Ken Curtis as Trooper Burch
X Brands as Tago
Roy Barcroft as Sgt. Doyle 
John Hubbard as Lt. Weeks
Claire Du Brey as Mrs. Kate Fenniman 
Syd Saylor as Elwood Fenniman
Chuck Hayward as Indian 
Charles Soldani as Indian
Eddie Little Sky as Indian (uncredited)

Production
Francis Lyon originally bought the story for his own Leo Productions. He eventually set up the movie with Batjac.

See also
 List of American films of 1959

References

External links

 Iverson Movie Ranch: History, vintage photos.
The "Rocky Hill", the Bell Ranch shooting location for Escort West and Elvis Presley's first movie, Love Me Tender

1959 films
1959 Western (genre) films
American Western (genre) films
Batjac Productions films
Films produced by John Wayne
Films directed by Francis D. Lyon
1950s English-language films
1950s American films